The 1998 CAF Cup was the seventh football club tournament season that took place for the runners-up of each African country's domestic league. It was won by CS Sfaxien in two-legged final victory against ASC Jeanne d'Arc.

Preliminary round

|}

First round

|}

Notes
1 2nd leg April 3 abandoned after 40 minutes at 2-1 for DC Motema Pembe due to thunderstorm; replayed April 4.

Second round

|}

Quarter-finals

|}

Semi-finals

|}

Final

|}

Winners

External links
CAF Cup 1998 - rsssf.com

3
1998